KSEX-CD, UHF digital channel 42, was a low-powered, Class A HSN-affiliated television station licensed to San Diego, California, United States. Founded December 5, 1990, the station was owned by Commercial Broadcasting Corporation.

History

Mi San Diego TV
KBOP-CA was a Spanish language station known as Mi San Diego TV, programmed by KNSD, an NBC affiliate co-owned by NBCUniversal and LIN Television, now an NBC owned-and-operated station. Much of the programming for KBOP-CA originated from Los Angeles Spanish independent station KWHY-TV, including its newscasts, Noticias 22, weekdays at 5 PM and weekends at 7 PM and 10 PM. However, KBOP-CA aired its own newscasts, Noticias Mi San Diego TV 43, weekdays at 7 PM and 10 PM. The station also provided Spanish-language broadcasts of San Diego Padres baseball games during the season and San Diego Chargers pre-season football games. In overnight hours (approximately 12:30 AM to 6:30 AM), KBOP-CA carried the Shop at Home shopping channel feed. In addition, to reach more viewers, KBOP was seen on digital cable on Cox channel 143 and Time Warner Cable channel 343.

Since 2007
In July 2007, it was announced that KNSD would discontinue its management of KBOP, including the end of Spanish-language programming on KBOP, effective September 1, 2007. Its news programs, Noticias Mi San Diego and Otro Vistazo, moved to early-morning timeslots on KNSD. KNSD continued to maintain the Mi San Diego TV branded web site, but without the channel 43 designation, for use with the two news shows. KNSD subsequently canceled Noticias Mi San Diego on December 5, 2008, as a result of budget cuts. The reason for this discontinuation of KNSD's management of KBOP and therefore the end of KBOP's Spanish-language programming was due to KBOP's limited availability—on one low-power station and on digital cable, while the other stations had analog cable coverage, a full-powered signal, and/or several low-powered transmitters.

After the discontinuation of Mi San Diego TV on September 1, 2007, KBOP replaced its programming with an all-infomercial format. Shop at Home programming was discontinued as well. Following the format change, Cox and Time Warner Cable dropped the station. On January 5, 2011, KBOP swapped callsigns with Dallas low-power TV station KSEX. On July 18, 2012, the station changed its call sign again to KSEX-CD, after converting to digital broadcasts on channel 42.

In the Federal Communications Commission (FCC)'s incentive auction, KSEX-CD sold its spectrum for $34,697,206; at the time, the station indicated that it would enter into a post-auction channel sharing agreement. KSEX-CD ceased operations October 31, 2017, and its license was surrendered to the FCC for cancellation on November 2, 2017.

References

External links 
Mi San Diego TV

SEX-CD
Television channels and stations established in 1990
Low-power television stations in the United States
1990 establishments in California
Television channels and stations disestablished in 2017
2017 disestablishments in California
Defunct television stations in the United States
SEX-CD